Irus reflexus is a bivalve mollusc of the family Veneridae

References

 Powell A. W. B., New Zealand Mollusca, William Collins Publishers Ltd, Auckland, New Zealand 1979 
 Photo

Veneridae
Bivalves of New Zealand
Taxa named by John Edward Gray